is a yonkoma manga series by Susumu Nemoto which ran from October 1, 1951, to March 31, 1965, in the Asahi Shimbun evening edition. Nemoto modeled the main character, Kuri-chan, after his oldest son who was born in 1948. The name of the main character is actually , and gets his nickname from his naturally curly hair which makes his head appear round (or kuri kuri). The manga is unusual in that, other than the images, it relies almost exclusively on onomotopeia rather than words to tell the story. In that regard it has been classified as a pantomime comic.

The manga depicts the life of a typical salaryman fairly accurately, but the main character becomes the salaryman's child, Kuri-chan. Because of this, there have been several picture books published, marketed at children, several of which are still in print as of 2008. A large amount of character goods featuring Kuri-chan continue to be produced as well.

In the last manga strip released, the first panel shows Kuri-chan at age one, the second at age five, the third at age fourteen, showing his growth and progression through the fifteen years of publication. The fourth panel, Kuri-chan gets annoyed at the manga author, Nemoto, for pointing out the details of how he looked at those ages.

Sources

External links
 Lambiek Comiclopedia article. 

1951 manga
Child characters in comics
Male characters in comics
Humor comics
Pantomime comics
Works originally published in Asahi Shimbun
Comics characters introduced in 1951
Yonkoma